"Jungle" is a song by Australian alternative rock artist Tash Sultana, released on 5 September 2016 as the third and final single from Sultana's extended play Notion (2016). The song peaked at number 39 on the ARIA Singles Chart, being her first top 50 single.

On 26 January 2017, the song placed number three on the Triple J Hottest 100, 2016, the third highest-placed song by an Australian artist.

The song is featured in FIFA 18.

Track listing
Digital download
 "Jungle" – 5:16

Digital download
 "Jungle"  (radio edit)  – 3:56

Charts

Weekly charts

Year-end charts

Certification

References 

2016 songs
2016 singles
Tash Sultana songs